Allentown is a ghost town in Clark County, in the U.S. state of Ohio. It was located within Green Township, but the precise location is unknown to the GNIS.

History
Allentown had its start in the mid-1830s when Aaron Allen built a sawmill there.

References

Geography of Clark County, Ohio
Ghost towns in Ohio
1830s establishments in Ohio